Tigh A Mhaoir is a building in Luss, Argyll and Bute, Scotland. It is a Category B listed structure dating from the early-to-mid 19th century.

The building, a single-storey cottage located at the northwestern corner of Pier Road and School Road, is constructed of painted rubble with pink sandstone margins and dressings. It possesses four-pane timber sash and case windows and narrow sandstone corniced ridge chimney stacks with octagonal cans.

The building is shown on the first-edition Ordnance Survey map, surveyed in 1864.

Gallery

See also
List of listed buildings in Luss

References

External links
View of the building – Google Street View, October 2016

19th-century establishments in Scotland
Listed buildings in Luss, Argyll and Bute
Category B listed buildings in Argyll and Bute